Young India was a weekly paper or journal in English founded by Lala Lajpat Rai in 1916  and later published by Mahatma Gandhi. Through this work, Mahatma Gandhi sought to popularise India's demand for independence or Swaraj.

It was published by Gandhi from 1919 to 1931.

Gandhi's writings in this journal inspired many. He used Young India to spread his unique ideology and thoughts regarding the use of nonviolence in organising movements and to urge readers to consider, organise, and plan for India's eventual independence from the United Kingdom.

In 1933 Gandhi started publishing a weekly newspaper, Harijan, in English. Harijan, which means "People of God", was also Gandhi's term for the untouchable caste. The newspaper lasted until 1948. During this time Gandhi also published Harijan Bandu in Gujarati, and Harijan Sevak in Hindi. All three papers focused on social and economic problems, both in India and elsewhere in the world.

See also 
Gandhi Heritage Portal, portal to preserve, and protect the works of Mahatma Gandhi

References

External links
Issues of Young India in the South Asian American Digital Archive (SAADA).
 Young India, Journal collection

Defunct magazines published in India
Defunct political magazines
English-language magazines published in India
Political magazines published in India
Weekly magazines published in India
Literature of Indian independence movement
Magazines established in 1919
Magazines disestablished in 1931
Mahatma Gandhi